The 2025 Rajya Sabha elections will be held as part of a routine six-year cycle among certain of the State Legislatures in India on July and August 2025 to elect 8 of its 245 members, of which the states through their legislators elect 233, and the remaining 4 are appointed by the President

Elections

Assam

Tamil Nadu

References 

Rajya Sabha
Rajya Sabha elections in India